Graphium fulleri is a butterfly in the family Papilionidae (swallowtails). It is found in Cameroon, Equatorial Guinea, Gabon, the Republic of the Congo, Angola, the Democratic Republic of the Congo and Chad.

Description
The broad black marginal band of the hindwing is always ornamented with light spots. The wings have a common light median band, which does not reach the base of the hindwing and is interrupted in cellule 5 of the forewing. Hindwing beneath without black basal, dot in cellule 7 and consequently with only two such dots. Hindwing with 3—8 usually double sub¬marginal spots. 
The markings are light yellow; the median band formed almost exactly as in G. ucalegon-, 
cell of the forewing with an apical spot and a streak at the hindmargin between veins 3 and 4; hindwing with two submarginal dots each in cellules 2—6 and with three large discal spots about in the middle of cellules 2—4, beneath red at the base.

Subspecies
Graphium fulleri fulleri (Cameroon, Congo)
Graphium fulleri boulleti (Le Cerf, 1912) (Cameroon, Equatorial Guinea, Gabon, Congo, Democratic Republic of the Congo)

Taxonomy
Graphium fulleri belongs to a species group with 16 members. All are very similar
The species group members are:
Graphium abri Smith & Vane-Wright, 2001 
Graphium adamastor  (Boisduval, 1836) 
Graphium agamedes (Westwood, 1842)
Graphium almansor (Honrath, 1884)
Graphium auriger (Butler, 1876) 
Graphium aurivilliusi (Seeldrayers, 1896)
Graphium fulleri (Grose-Smith, 1883)
Graphium hachei (Dewitz, 1881)
Graphium kigoma Carcasson, 1964
Graphium olbrechtsi Berger, 1950
Graphium poggianus (Honrath, 1884)
Graphium rileyi Berger, 1950
Graphium schubotzi (Schultze, 1913)
Graphium simoni (Aurivillius, 1899),
Graphium ucalegon  (Hewitson, 1865)[
Graphium ucalegonides (Staudinger, 1884)

Biogeographic realm
Afrotropical realm

References

External links
Global Butterfly Information System Images of specimens and types in Museum für Naturkunde, Berlin. (G. fulleri ssp. divisimacula, foersterius, sanganoides, sanganus) 

External images

fulleri
Butterflies of Africa
Lepidoptera of Angola
Lepidoptera of Cameroon
Insects of Chad
Lepidoptera of the Democratic Republic of the Congo
Insects of Equatorial Guinea
Lepidoptera of Gabon
Lepidoptera of the Republic of the Congo
Butterflies described in 1883
Taxa named by Henley Grose-Smith